As Said District is a district of the Shabwah Governorate in Yemen. As of 2003, the district had a population of 35,034 inhabitants.

References

Districts of Shabwah Governorate